Luciano Lima da Silva (born 11 March 1981), commonly known as Luciano Bebê is a Brazilian retired footballer.

AEL Limassol

When he moved to the Cypriot First Division with AEL Limassol, he made an instant impact. Coupled with excellent performances from both Bebe and the rest of the team, including Matías Omar Degra they went on to win the league for the first time since 1968. It was Bebe who scored the Title winning goal in a match against Anorthosis Famagusta FC to give the Lions a title for the first time in over 20 years.

References

External links
 
planotatico.com

Honours
AEL Limassol
Cypriot First Division: 2011-12

1981 births
Living people
Brazilian footballers
Association football midfielders
Esporte Clube Noroeste players
Esporte Clube Santo André players
Criciúma Esporte Clube players
Clube de Regatas Brasil players
Agremiação Sportiva Arapiraquense players
G.D. Estoril Praia players
AEL Limassol players
AC Omonia players
Nea Salamis Famagusta FC players
Liga Portugal 2 players
Cypriot First Division players
Brazilian expatriate footballers
Brazilian expatriate sportspeople in Portugal
Brazilian expatriate sportspeople in Cyprus
Expatriate footballers in Portugal
Expatriate footballers in Cyprus